Jason P. Lester is an endurance athlete, the author of the book Running on Faith, and the 2009 ESPY Award winner for Best Male Athlete with a Disability. He is the first disabled athlete to complete the Ultraman World Championships. He is the Founder of EPIC5 Challenge, EP1CMAN and The NEVER STOP Foundation est. 2007.

Lester has completed endurance challenges such as the EPIC5 Challenge (5 Iron distance triathlons on 5 Hawaiian islands in 5 consecutive days), and a  run and  bike across the United States. He ran  along The Great Wall of China in 83 days, setting a world record by becoming the first person to run the length of the wall solo in a single attempt.

Early life
Lester grew up playing baseball and football. When he was twelve years old, he was hit while on his bicycle by a woman driving  who ran a red light. He was left for dead with 21 broken bones and a collapsed lung. Lester lost the use of his right arm, which became partially paralyzed as a result of the accident. During the next several months he began a lengthy hospital recovery. While he was still in the hospital recovering, his father, and sole guardian, died of a heart attack. Twelve months after the accident, he went on to continue to play baseball and football, making the all star game with the use of only one arm.  Lester continued to play sports throughout high school and college.  He began to compete in running and biathlon races at age 16, and by age 18 was ranked #2 for biathlons in the state of Arizona.

Triathlon
Lester competed in the 2008 and 2009 Ironman World Championships in Kona. In 2008, Lester became the first disabled athlete to complete the Ultraman World Championships. In June 2009, at Ironman 70.3 Hawaii, Lester came in 3rd in his age group, which qualified him to compete in the Ironman World Championships later that year. That same summer, in July 2009, Lester became the first male triathlete to win an ESPY Award. In August 2009, Lester became the 25th person to complete both Ultraman Canada and Ultraman Hawaii out of 428 total competitors. In November 2009, Lester became the 15th athlete in the history of Ultraman to complete both Hawaii and Canada in the same year.

On May 5, 2013, Lester made a  transcontinental run across America in 72 days. The run was a collaborative service project with Waves For Water. Waves For Water is an active presence and force for the Hurricane Sandy Relief Initiative, which supports neighborhoods and communities recovering from Hurricane Sandy.

The NEVER STOP Foundation
In 2007, Lester founded the Never Stop Foundation. The NEVER STOP Foundation is dedicated to using athletics as a tool to encourage all youth to have the chance to achieve their full potential. The goal is to help those in their formative years find their own true voice, help them build their confidence, improve their communication skills and learn the values of discipline, trust, compassion, self-reliance, and respect.

Racing and endurance highlights
 RUNAUS — The first American male to run across Australia. Jason P. Lester's Trans Australia Run started in Scarborough Beach, Western Australia and ended 135 days later in Batemans Bay, New South Wales. (August 2016)
 72 consecutive hour run - 2014
 Run Across America Ran 3,550 miles across the United States (July 2013)
 The Great Wall Run – first person to run  along The Great Wall of China in 83 days solo in a single attempt (2014)
Lester became the 4th-fastest runner to run from San Francisco City Hall to New York City Hall (The official USA Crosser's route) 2013
 Ran  in 24 hours on a treadmill in 2013
 Completed three consecutive iron distance triathlons in 52 hours, 2012
 Ran 26 marathons in 26 consecutive days, 2012
 Ran and biked  from Manhattan, NY to Portland, OR, 16 States - 102 days, 2012
 Ran  from Las Vegas to Mt. Whitney, 2011 (1st male athlete to complete)
 EPIC5- 5 Iron Distance Triathlons | 5 Hawaiian Islands, 2010, 2011, 2012
 Ultraman Canada, 2008 (4th place overall in the run, 2009 (14th place overall)
 Ultraman Hawaii World Championships, 2008 (24th overall), 2009 (18th overall), 2010
 Ironman World Championship, 2008, 2009
 Ironman Arizona, 2007, 2008
 Ironman Western Australia, 2007
 70.3 Honolulu, 2009 (3rd in age group, and qualified for Ironman World Championships), 2010
 Ultramarathon – Hilo to Volcano, 2008 (9th place overall)
 UItramarathon – Western States 100, 2009 (pacer)
 UItramarathon – Badwater Ultramarathon 135, 2011 (pacer)
 ITU Triathlon World Championships, 2007 (6th place), 2008 (2nd in category)
 The Nautica New York City Triathlon, 2007 (2nd in category)
 Duathlon – Pac Crest Endurance, 2008 (3rd in age group)
 Scottsdale Duathlon, 2005, (1st in age group, 2nd overall)

Awards
 Most Inspirational People In Health And Fitness | AskMen.com, 2016 
 ESPY Award Winner - Best Male Athlete with a Disability, 2009 
 USAT (USA Triathlon) PC Athlete of the Year, 2008
 USAT (USA Triathlon) PC Athlete of the Year Finalist, 2007

References

External links

EPIC5 Challenge website

1974 births
Living people
American male ultramarathon runners
American male triathletes
People from Arizona
People from Kailua-Kona, Hawaii
Sportspeople from Hawaii